Middleburg is an unincorporated community in northern Zane Township, Logan County, Ohio, United States.  It has a post office with the ZIP code 43336.  It is located at the intersection of State Route 287 with County Road 153, near the headwaters of the Big Darby Creek and a short distance southwest of U.S. Route 33.

Middleburg was platted in 1832.

References

External links
Detailed Logan County map

Unincorporated communities in Logan County, Ohio
1832 establishments in Ohio
Populated places established in 1832
Unincorporated communities in Ohio